Patrick Drahi (born 20 August 1963) is an Israeli billionaire, businessman telecoms, media tycoon, and investor, magnate. A former French citizen, he has been living in Switzerland since 1999. He is the founder and controlling shareholder of the European-based telecom group Altice, listed on the European Euronext Stock Exchange and Patrick Drahi also owns 18% of BT Group.

Early life
Drahi was born in Casablanca, Morocco to a Jewish family. When he was 15 years old, the family moved to Montpellier, France. His parents are both math teachers. Drahi has an engineering degree from the École Polytechnique university in Paris, and a post-graduate degree in optics and electronics.

Business career
Drahi's business career began when he and an American partner convinced mayors in southern France to allow them to lay cable for television in their towns.  This company was later sold to John C. Malone's UPC. Drahi was paid in UPC stock and went to Geneva to work for the company.  He sold his position in UPC for approximately 40 million Euros just before the dot-com bubble burst. In 2001, he founded the Amsterdam-based holding company Altice ATCE.AS, which soon began to buy up European cable companies.

Drahi owns the Israeli cable television company HOT.

In 2013, Drahi founded the international news channel i24news, based in Israel, and broadcasting in French, Arabic, and English.

Drahi founded the French cable operator Numericable. In 2013, Drahi bought SFR, the second largest mobile phone and internet provider in France, from media conglomerate Vivendi.

Drahi and his group Altice entered the American telecommunications market in 2015 by purchasing a 70 per cent stake in Suddenlink Communications, the seventh-largest cable company in the US. Suddenlink is valued at $9.1 billion. Also in 2015, Drahi bought Cablevision from the Dolan family, renaming it Altice USA with its flagship brand Optimum being the fifth-largest cable operator in the USA. In 2018, the Dolans sued Altice USA over alleged violations of the terms of the sale.

As of November 2015, Forbes estimated Drahi's net worth at $10.3 billion. Forbes ranked him as the 60th-richest person in the world, the third-richest person in France. He was ranked as the richest person in Israel, until 2016, when he came in second.

In June 2019, Sotheby's announced it was being acquired by Drahi at a 61% market premium.

In September 2020, to take the company private, Drahi offered €2.5 billion to minority shareholders of Altice. An increased bid was accepted in January 2021.

On 5 March 2021, Forbes listed his net worth at US$11.7 billion, ranking him 248 on the Billionaires 2020 list.

Personal life
Drahi is married and lives in Geneva, Switzerland with his wife.  His children live in Lausanne, Tel Aviv, and Bristol.

In 2013, Drahi's lawyer had said in a statement to Challenges, who were going to include him in a list of France's top 500 fortunes, that he had given up his French nationality to become an Israeli national.

In 2014, Drahi and his wife Lina created the Patrick and Lina Drahi Foundation (PLFA) to support innovative programs in the areas of science and education, entrepreneurship and innovation, the arts, and Israel and the Jewish people, through organizational grants.  Incorporated in 2016 and headquartered in Zermatt, Switzerland, the foundation supports programs in Switzerland, France and Portugal.

Notes

References

1963 births
École Polytechnique alumni
Israeli billionaires
French mass media owners
20th-century Moroccan Jews
People from Casablanca
Living people
Businesspeople from Geneva
Cable television company founders
French television company founders
Altice (company)